The Learjet 24 is an American six-to-eight-seat (two crew and four to six passengers) twin-engine, high-speed business jet, which was manufactured by Learjet as the successor to the Learjet 23.

History

The Learjet 24 was designed as an improved version of the Learjet 23, which was limited to  gross weight.  Engineers designed the model 24 to accept up to the full  gross weight permitted by FAR-25 standards.

Other improvements introduced in the Learjet 24 included:
 increased cabin pressurization, to allow a higher operating altitude
 the addition of one extra window on the right side of the cabin
 more powerful engines
 a new windshield
 auxiliary fuel in wing tip tanks
 a fire-extinguishing system for the engines

With these changes, the LJ24 became the first business jet to be certified under FAR-25.

The first flight of a Learjet 24 took place on January 24, 1966.  From May 23 to 26, 1966, a Learjet 24 flew around the world in 50 hours and 20 minutes flying time as a demonstration of its capabilities.
Different variants were the 24A, B, C, D, E and F, with changes of takeoff weight, in-fuselage fuel tank, range, cabin and engines.

Altogether 259 Model 24s were built, and in 2001, there were still 210 Learjet 24s in use. Thirty-nine LJ24s have been lost through accidents.

Noise compliance
In 2013, the FAA modified 14 CFR part 91 rules to prohibit the operation of jets weighing 75,000 pounds or less that are not stage 3 noise compliant after December 31, 2015.  The Learjet 24 is listed explicitly in Federal Register 78 FR 39576.  Any Learjet 24s that have not been modified by installing Stage 3 noise compliant engines or have not had "hushkits" installed for non-compliant engines will not be permitted to fly in the contiguous 48 states after December 31, 2015.  14 CFR §91.883 Special flight authorizations for jet airplanes weighing 75,000 pounds or less – lists special flight authorizations that may be granted for operation after December 31, 2015.

Variants

Learjet 24A
Standard version. Converted from existing Learjet 23. Takeoff weight . FAA certified on November 9, 1966. 81 aircraft built.

Learjet 24B
Improved variant, powered by two  thrust General Electric CJ610-6 turbojet engines, and  maximum take-off weight. FAA certified December 17, 1968. 49 aircraft built.

Learjet 24C
A light-weight version of the 24B, fuselage tank not fitted which would have caused a reduction in range. The Learjet 24C project was abandoned in December 1970. Take-off weight . None built.

Learjet 24D
Round cabin windows replaced by angular. FAA certified July 17, 1970. Replaced the 24B in production. A reduced gross weight (restricted to  version was also available (the 24D/A). 99 built.

Learjet 24D/A
Light-weight version with a restricted take-off weight of 5,669 kg (12,500 lb).

Learjet 24E and 24F
Two new versions were announced in 1976 the 24E and 24F, they introduced a new cambered wing and aerodynamic improvements to reduce stall and approach speed (Century III wing). The 24E did not have a fuselage fuel tank for higher payload but shorter range. Some 24E models had the fuselage tank installed later to restore range. Powered by two   thrust General Electric CJ610-8A turbojet engines.

Operators
Mainly used by private individuals and corporations, one aircraft was used by NASA as the Lear Jet Observatory

Accidents and incidents
On January 6, 1977, Dolly Sinatra the mother of Frank Sinatra was one of four killed when Learjet 24 N12MK crashed into a mountain following a departure from Palm Springs Airport, United States.

Aircraft on display

 055 – Learjet 24 on static display at the Tillamook Air Museum in Tillamook, Oregon.
 24-131 – Learjet 24 on static display at Wings Over the Rockies Air and Space Museum in Denver, Colorado.
 193 – Learjet 24B on display at the Dakota Territory Air Museum in Minot, North Dakota.
 203 – Learjet 24B on static display at the Evergreen Aviation & Space Museum in McMinnville, Oregon.
 281 – Learjet 24D on display at the Frontiers of Flight Museum in Dallas, Texas.
 Learjet 24D on display at ITE College Central
163 - Learjet 24F on display at Lewis University in Romeoville, Illinois. Formerly owned by Arnold Palmer from 1968-1976. Donated to Lewis By Waste Management in 1986 for use by maintenance students in their Aviation Department.

Specifications (Learjet 24F)

See also

References
Notes

Bibliography
 Taylor, John W. R. Jane's All The World's Aircraft 1976–77. London:Jane's Yearbooks, 1976. .

External links

 A history of the LJ23-LJ29 series on Airliners.net – not to be reached 5 October 2016
 Listing of LJ24 accidents in ASN Aviation Safety Database

24
1960s United States business aircraft
Twinjets
T-tail aircraft
Aircraft first flown in 1966